Perissocoeleum is a genus of flowering plants belonging to the family Apiaceae.

Its native range is Colombia to Venezuela.

Species:

Perissocoeleum barclayae 
Perissocoeleum crinoideum 
Perissocoeleum phylloideum 
Perissocoeleum purdiei

References

Apioideae
Apioideae genera